Knud Heinesen (born 1932) is a Danish economist and politician who held various cabinet posts, including the minister of education and minister of finance. In 1985 he retired from politics and involved in business.

Early life and education
Heinesen was born in Kerteminde on 26 September 1932. He was adopted by his aunt due to the fact that his mother died when he was seven years old. He was raised in Vangede. He attended Aurehøj Gymnasium in Gentofte and graduated in 1951. He studied economics at the University of Copenhagen. He joined a social democratic student organization, Frit Forum, during his studies at the university. In 1959 he graduated from the University of Copenhagen.

Career
Following graduation Heinesen worked as a high school teacher in Roskilde. In the period 1960–1962 he worked as a secretary in the Labor Movement's business council (AE), but he returned to Roskilde High School to work as the headmaster in 1962 and continued to work there until 1967. In 1963 Heinesen became a member of the Radio Council and in 1967 he was appointed chairman of the council which he held until 1971. The same year he resigned from his job as headmaster and began to involve in politics being a member of the Social Democrats. In 1971 Heinesen was elected to the Danish Parliament and was appointed minister of education the same year. He was in office until September 1973 when Ritt Bjerregaard replaced him in the post in a cabinet reshuffle. Heinesen was appointed minister of budget in the same reshuffle, replacing Per Hækkerup in the post. Heinesen's term was very brief and ended in December that year. In 1975 he was named minister of finance in the second cabinet of Prime Minister Anker Jørgensen. Heinesen resigned from office in 1979, but he served as the vice president of the Social Democrats.

In 1981 Heinesen served as the minister of public works when Jens Risgaard Knudsen had to resign from the office due to his involvement in a scandal. Heinesen's last cabinet post was the minister of finance which he held in the period 1981–1982 again in the cabinet led by Anker Jørgensen. Heinesen retired from politics in 1985 and became director of Copenhagen Airport. In period 1989–1995 he served as the director of several companies and was also a member of the boards of different companies.

References

20th-century Danish businesspeople
21st-century Danish businesspeople
1932 births
Danish Finance Ministers
Education ministers of Denmark
Members of the Folketing 1971–1973
Members of the Folketing 1973–1975
Members of the Folketing 1975–1977
Members of the Folketing 1977–1979
Members of the Folketing 1979–1981
Social Democrats (Denmark) politicians
University of Copenhagen alumni
Living people
Members of the Folketing 1981–1984
People from Kerteminde